Duro Bag Mfg is the largest paper bag manufacturer in the world and produces paper bags for numerous companies in the US.  Duro Bag Mfg was founded in Covington, Kentucky in 1953 by Mr. S. David Shor and is still a privately owned company. Duro Bag is the only manufacturing facility at the Port of Brownsville that is non-maritime related. Charles Shor, who became President and Chief Executive Officer in 1987, ran the company started by his father until July 1, 2014.

South Carolina-based Hilex Poly Co. LLC. acquired Duro in July 2014.

Duro has purchased some of its larger competitors in order to expand its geographical reach and enhance the company's production capabilities. Duro Bag has over 1,800 employees working at 11 facilities across the country, with the corporate office located in Northern Kentucky.  The manufacturing sites are located in Alsip IL, Brownsville TX, Covington KY, Elizabeth NJ, Florence KY, Jackson TN, Richmond VA, Rio Bravo MX, Tolleson AZ, and Walton KY along with art departments in Walton KY and Yulee FL.

Divisions
Duro Bag is a full-service bag manufacturer with two divisions:
The Standard Products Division produces Grocery Bags; Grocery Sacks; Handle Bags; Merchandise Bags; Paper Lawn and Leaf Bags; and various Specialty Bags, including Lunch Bags, Pharmacy Bags, Liquor Bags, Freshness Paper Bread Bags, Food Service Bags, and more.

The Designer Division produces the broadest range of machine-made paper shopping bags in the industry. The variety of applications includes Retail, Resale, Restaurant/Food Service, and Medical/Pharmaceutical.

Duro also has in-house Art Departments in both Kentucky and Florida. Both departments have talented artists operating the latest Electronic Pre-Press Equipment. These artists assist in the development of customer artwork, print layouts, and marketing material. The Sales and Marketing Offices are located in Kentucky, with regional salespeople and an extensive broker network throughout the country.

Many of their employees, such as Brenda Nieves, also have their names stamped on the bottom of their bags.

Sustainability and green initiatives
Duro Bag Mfg is a company that is committed to sustainability and was the first paper bag manufacturer in North America that produced a paper bag made from 100% Post-consumer Recycled fiber paper.

Duro Bag has a half-century history of reducing and re-using waste at its manufacturing operations by recycling 100% of the Kraft and Bleached paper waste from the production process.  The company also incorporate high levels of pre- and post-consumer waste fibers in its products. They also demonstrates a commitment to net reductions in greenhouse gas emissions and water usage and has obtained third-party certifications from the Forest Stewardship Council (FSC) and the Rainforest Alliance for its lines of 100% post consumer recycled bags produced from its plants in Florence KY, Walton KY, Tolleson AZ and Alsip IL. Duro Bag is a member of the Sustainable Packaging Coalition, associate member of the American Forest & Paper Association, sponsor of Earth Share and a member of the Greater Cincinnati Earth Coalition.

References

External links
 Duro Bag official website (www.durobag.com)
 Forest Stewardship Council (FSC)
 Rainforest Alliance

Packaging companies of the United States
Covington, Kentucky